The streak-headed mannikin (Mayrimunia tristissima) also known as the streak-headed munia, is a small  long estrildid finch.

Description
Mainly dark brown plumage with light streaking on head and yellowish rump; subspecies leucosticta also with white spotting on face, breast and upper wing-coverts. The call is a short buzzing note, repeated in flight.

Habitat and distribution
Endemic to New Guinea and some adjacent islands. It has been recorded from Saibai Island, Queensland, Australian territory in north-western Torres Strait. Its preferred habitat is the grassy fringes of streams, forest clearings and abandoned gardens with secondary growth, in lowland New Guinea up to  altitude.

Behaviour and ecology

Breeding
A globular grass nest is constructed with side entrance, often suspended from rattans, in forest or at forest edge.

Food and feeding
The diet is mainly seeds and berries but it also includes some insects.

Conservation
As a species with a large range and no evidence of population decline, it is assessed as being of Least Concern.

References 

 Beehler, Bruce M.; & Finch, Brian W. (1985). Species Checklist of the Birds of New Guinea. RAOU Monograph No.1. Royal Australasian Ornithologists Union: Melbourne. 
 Beehler, Bruce M.; Pratt, Thane K.; & Zimmerman, Dale A. (1986). Birds of New Guinea. Wau Ecology Handbook No.9. Princeton University Press. 
 BirdLife International (2006) Species factsheet: Lonchura tristissima. Downloaded from http://www.birdlife.org on 3 Feb 2007
 Coates, Brian J. (1990). The Birds of Papua New Guinea. Vol.II: Passerines. Dove Publications: Alderly, Queensland. 

streak-headed mannikin
Birds of New Guinea
streak-headed mannikin
Taxobox binomials not recognized by IUCN